Benoît Lahaye is a Grower Champagne producer. He took over his family's domaine in the Montagne de Reims in 1993. The estate has  of vines, became organic-certified in 2003, and biodynamic-certified in 2010. (Certified organic vineyards account for only around 1% of the total land in the Champagne wine region.) Eighty-eight percent of the vineyards are planted with pinot noir.

References

External links
 Natural Champagne Kyle Ridington, March 30, 2018

Champagne producers
Living people
Year of birth missing (living people)